Cnex is an animated programme on the Welsh channel S4C.

Overview
The show was written by Paul Lewis and Keith Rees. Cnex animates Welsh celebrities including, Bryn Terfel, Glyn Wise, Rhodri Morgan, Charlotte Church, Gavin Henson, Dai Jones, Iolo Williams and Siân Lloyd.

References

External links 
 Cnex's website on S4C 
 Cnex on IMDb

British adult animated comedy television series